Chiang Tsai-yun (born 1934)  is a former table tennis player from Taiwan. She won two gold medals in women's doubles and women's team events in the Asian Table Tennis Championships in 1957.

References

1934 births
Taiwanese female table tennis players
Asian Games medalists in table tennis
Table tennis players at the 1958 Asian Games
Asian Games bronze medalists for Chinese Taipei
Medalists at the 1958 Asian Games
Living people